Golden Mountains is a 1931 Soviet silent drama film directed by Sergei Yutkevich. A re-edited sound version of the film was released in 1936.

Plot
The film is set in the year 1914. Having received a large military order, the administration of the St. Petersburg metallurgical plant "Krutilov and Son" is attracting new workers. However at the plant a strike is looming under the influence of a powerful strike movement of the Baku oil workers'.

The engineer, son of the factory owner, tries to bribe the former farmer Pyotr and make him the leader of the newly arrived workers. In this case the engineer is actively helped by the master. Pyotr takes part in the assassination of activist-worker Vasili. As a result of the circumstances the hero is forced to bring home the wounded Bolshevik. Once in the environment of striking workers Pyotr enters into their ranks and engages in class struggle.

Cast
 Boris Poslavsky - Pyotr, the country boy
 Yuri Korvin-Krukovsky - Industrialist Krutilov
 Boris Fedosyev - Krutilov's son
 Ivan Shtraukh - Vasili, Bolshevik organizer
 Boris Tenin - Windy
 Nikolai Michurin -Nikolai (foreman)
 Natalya Razumova -The Girl
 Konstantin Nazarenko
 Nikoloz Shengelaya -Man from Baku oil fields
 Fyodor Slavsky
 Leonid Kmit
 Stepan Kayukov
 Boris Chirkov

External links

1931 films
Lenfilm films
Soviet black-and-white films
Soviet silent feature films
Films directed by Sergei Yutkevich
Films scored by Dmitri Shostakovich
Soviet drama films
1931 drama films
1930s Russian-language films
Silent drama films